Pella Township is one of twelve townships in Ford County, Illinois, USA.  As of the 2010 census, its population was 176 and it contained 85 housing units.  It was formed as Clyde Township from a portion of Brenton Township on March 2, 1870; its name was changed to Pella Township on June 16, 1870.

Geography

Cities, towns, villages
 Piper City (South edge)

Major highways
  Illinois Route 115

Airports and landing strips
 Read Airport

Demographics

School districts
 Iroquois West Community Unit School District 10
 Tri Point Community Unit School District 6-J

Political districts
 Illinois' 15th congressional district
 State House District 105
 State Senate District 53

References
 
 United States Census Bureau 2007 TIGER/Line Shapefiles
 United States National Atlas

External links
 City-Data.com
 Illinois State Archives

Townships in Ford County, Illinois
Townships in Illinois
1870 establishments in Illinois